Haissa Hima, better known as Haissa Mariko (born 26 July 1951) was the first woman parachutist in Niger.

Life
Haissa Mariko entered the Nigerien Army in 1966 and received her diploma in parachuting on 20 February 1967.

References

1951 births
Living people
Military parachuting
Nigerien military personnel
Place of birth missing (living people)
Nigerien women